Driscoll Independent School District is a public school district based in Driscoll, Texas, United States.
The district serves students in prekindergarten to grade 8.
In 2009, Driscoll ISD was rated as "exemplary" by the Texas Education Agency, the highest rating given by the state.

References

External links
 

School districts in Nueces County, Texas